Kim Un-bae (김 은배; August 21, 1913 – February 15, 1980) was a Korean runner. He competed in the marathon at the 1932 Olympics and finished in sixth place.

He competed for Japan under his Japanese name Kin Onbai as Korea was part of the Japanese Empire at the time. The name is based on the Japanese kanji pronunciation of his Korean hanja name 金 恩培.

References

1913 births
1980 deaths
Japanese male long-distance runners
Korean male long-distance runners
Olympic athletes of Japan
Athletes (track and field) at the 1932 Summer Olympics
Korean male marathon runners
20th-century Japanese people